These articles lists the world's deepest lakes.

Lakes ranked by maximum depth

This list contains all lakes whose maximum depth is reliably known to exceed Geologically, the Caspian Sea, like the Black and Mediterranean seas, is a remnant of the ancient Tethys Ocean. The deepest area is oceanic rather than continental crust. However, it is generally regarded by geographers as a large endorheic salt lake.

 Lakes ranked by mean depth 

Mean depth can be a more useful indicator than maximum depth for many ecological purposes. Unfortunately, accurate mean depth figures are only available for well-studied lakes, as they must be calculated by dividing the lake's volume by its surface area. A reliable volume figure requires a bathymetric survey. Therefore, mean depth figures are not available for many deep lakes in remote locations. The average lake on Earth has the mean depth 41.8 meters (137.14 feet) 

The Caspian Sea ranks much further down the list on mean depth, as it has a large continental shelf (significantly larger than the oceanic basin that contains its greatest depths).

This list contains all lakes whose mean depth is reliably known to exceed 100 metres (328 ft).

Greatest maximum depth by continent
 Africa — 1: Tanganyika, 2: Malawi, 3: Kivu
 Antarctica — 1: Radok (surface lake); Vostok (subglacial lake)
 Asia — 1: Baikal, (2: Caspian Sea), 3: Issyk Kul, (3: Matano)
 Europe — 1: Hornindalsvatnet, 2: Salvatnet, 3: Lake Tinn 
 North America — 1: Great Slave , 2: Crater, 3: Quesnel
 Central America — 1: Atitlán, 2: Chicabal
 Oceania — 1: Hauroko, 2: Manapouri, 3: Te Anau 
 Australia — 1: St Clair
 South America — 
1: Viedma
2: O'Higgins/San Martín, 
3: General Carrera-Buenos Aires,

Greatest mean depth by continent
Africa — 1: Tanganyika, 2: Malawi, 3: Kivu
Antarctica — 1: Vostok
Asia — 1: Baikal, 2: Tazawa, 3: Issyk-Kul
Europe — 1: Crveno, 2: Hornindalsvatnet, 3: Lake Tinn
North America — 1: Crater, 2: Tahoe, 3: Adams
Oceania — 1: Te Anau, 2: Manapouri, 3: Wakatipu
South America — 1: General Carrera-Buenos Aires, 2: Quilotoa, 3: Fagnano

See also

List of lakes by area
List of lakes by volume
 List of largest lakes of Europe

NotesNote: Lake depths often vary depending on sources. The depths used here are the most reliable figures available in recent sources. See the articles on individual lakes for more details and data sources.''

Sources
Worldlakes.org, Deepest lakes

External links
Environmentalgraffiti.com - 10 deepest lakes with pictures

Lakes
Vertical position